Mark Petersen may refer to:

 Mark E. Petersen (1900–1984), member of the Quorum of the Twelve Apostles of The Church of Jesus Christ of Latter-day Saints
 Mark Petersen (musician), New Zealand rock guitarist
 Mark C. Petersen, composer who created Geodesium, which is music for Planetarium shows

See also
 Mark Peterson (disambiguation)